Atul Kumar is an Indian ophthalmologist who is currently the Chief & Professor of Ophthalmology at Dr. Rajendra Prasad Centre for Ophthalmic Sciences (RPC-AIIMS), the national apex ophthalmic centre at All India Institute of Medical Sciences, Delhi. He was awarded the Padma Shri award in January 2007 for his services to the medical field. He specializes in vitreoretinal surgery and also heads the Vitreo-Retinal, Uvea and ROP services at RPC-AIIMS.

Early life and education 
Born in September 1956, Kumar had a non-medical background. After finishing his schooling from Modern School, Barakhamba in Delhi, he graduated from the Maulana Azad Medical College. Later, he pursued his higher studies in Ophthalmology from Dr. Rajendra Prasad Centre for Ophthalmic Sciences at All India Institute of Medical Sciences, Delhi (AIIMS). He achieved the degree of Doctor of Medicine (MD). He further completed his senior residency in vitreo-retina and uvea unit from the same institute and afterwards joined as Faculty at Dr. Rajendra Prasad Centre for Ophthalmic Sciences at AIIMS itself. In 1991, he went on to pursue fellowship in vitreoretinal surgery from University of Maryland, Baltimore County.

Achievements and positions 

Kumar is a specialist in diseases of the retina, vitreous and uvea and their management. His academic disciplines include Vitreoretinal surgery, Ophthalmic Lasers, Uveal diseases, Macular Hole surgery, anti-VEGF injections, Age Related Macular Degeneration, Retinal Detachment surgery, Myopic Traction Maculopathy, Pathological Myopia and Macular Hole Retinal Detachment.

He is presently the Chief and Professor of Ophthalmology at Dr. Rajendra Prasad Centre for Ophthalmic Sciences, preceded in this post by Prof. Yog Raj Sharma. He is also commissioned as the Honorary Advisor in Ophthalmology to the Government of India (2016) and the Honorary Vitreo-Retinal Consultant to Armed Forces Medical Services from 2015-2018. Under his leadership, AIIMS doctors announced India as free of the eye infection Trachoma in March 2017. This announcement came as a part of golden jubilee celebration of the institute. Kumar is steering the national efforts towards elimination of blindness by heading the WHO Collaborating Centre for Prevention of Blindness in SEARO. Kumar has been associated with several organizations and holds positions of responsibilities with many of them.

Kumar is also a member of national and state ophthalmological societies in India and has held examiner positions in various medical examinations for graduates and postgraduates. He is presently the Chairman of the Advocacy Committee of All India Ophthalmological Society and the Honorary Editor of Indian Journal of Ophthalmology (IJO) on whose editorial board, he has been working previously. He has been a Past Chairperson of the Scientific Committee of Vitreo-Retinal Society of India (VRSI), a scientific organization of posterior-segment eye surgeons of India.

Awards and recognitions 

The Padma Shri award was awarded to Kumar in 2007 by the 13th President of India, Shri Pranab Mukherjee. It is the fourth highest civilian award in India, given for services in medicine. The President of India has also conferred Dr. B.C. Roy National award to him for excellence in field of medicine in the category of Eminent Medical Teacher. The University Grants Commission recognized his scientific work by giving Hari Om Ashram Trust Award for role as outstanding social scientist for interaction between science and society. Kumar is also a fellow of National Academy of Medical Sciences, 2006. The alumni body of his high school too has felicitated him with Modern School Old Student Association (MSOSA) Excellence Award. Very recently, in 2017, he has been awarded the Fellowship of the Royal College of Surgeons, Edinburgh FRCS (ad hominem) for his furtherance and excellence in vitreo-retinal surgical techniques.

Controversy 
In April 2018, Kumar stirred up controversy by slapping a resident doctor at the RPC, eliciting major protests from the resident doctors of AIIMS.

Publications 
Kumar has over 250 publications in medical journals, chapters in over 20 books, authored various books on diseases of the retina and vitreous and their management.

Selected books/chapters 

 Ocular Tuberculosis
 Ocular Infections: Prophylaxis and Management
 Lasers in Ophthalmology
 Ophthalmology Clinics for Postgraduates
 Disorders of Retina and Vitreous
 "Angiogenic Agents and Photodynamic Therapy" in Pharmacology of Ocular Therapeutics
 'Retinal Laser Scanning and Digital Imaging' in 'Clinical Ophthalmology: Contemporary Perspectives'
 Contributions in Rashtriya Sahara (Volume 2, Issue 2), released by Sahara India Mass Communication, 1991

See also 
 Vitreoretinal Surgery
 Macular Disorders
 Macular Hole
 Retinal Detachment
 Retinal Implant
 All India Institute of Medical Sciences
 Yog Raj Sharma

References

External links 
 "Atul Kumar" Microsoft Academic Search. 2016. Retrieved 25 September 2017.
 https://www.news18.com/news/india/aiims-strike-enters-day-2-resident-doctors-unhappy-with-kumar-going-on-leave-1732203.html 
 https://m.timesofindia.com/videos/city/delhi/aiims-resident-doctors-go-on-indefinite-strike-after-professor-slaps-colleague/videoshow/63939550. 
 https://www.indiatoday.in/pti-feed/story/day-3-aiims-resident-doctors-continue-strike-1222186-2018-04-28 
 http://www.newindianexpress.com/nation/2018/apr/28/senior-aiims-doctor-accused-of-slapping-colleague-submits-apology-healthcare-services-still-hit-as-1807324.html

Recipients of the Padma Shri in medicine
Indian ophthalmologists
Academic staff of the All India Institute of Medical Sciences, New Delhi
Fellows of the National Academy of Medical Sciences
Indian surgeons
Living people
Year of birth missing (living people)
20th-century Indian medical doctors
20th-century surgeons